Fiumicino is a town and comune in the Metropolitan City of Rome, Lazio, central Italy, with a population of 80,500 (2019). It is known for being the site of Leonardo da Vinci–Fiumicino Airport, the busiest airport in Italy and the eleventh-busiest in Europe.

History

Etymology
The name literally means little river. The town of "Fiumicino" should not be confused with its namesake, Fiumicino, a small river near Rimini.

Recent history
Fiumicino became a comune in 1992; previously it was part of the municipality of Rome, being almost totally included in the former Municipio XIV.

On 24 August 2013, a small mud volcano popped up at the centre of the via Coccia di Morto roundabout.

Geography
Located by the Tyrrhenian coast. Fiumicino borders the municipalities of Anguillara Sabazia, Cerveteri, Ladispoli and Rome. It is on the northern side of the mouth of the river Tiber, next to Ostia.

It includes the hamlets (frazioni) of Aeroporto "Leonardo da Vinci", Ara Nova (or Aranova), Casale del Castellaccio, Castel Campanile, Focene, Fregene, Isola Sacra, Le Vignole, Maccarese, Palidoro, Parco Leonardo, Passo Oscuro (or Passoscuro), Porto, Testa di Lepre, Torre in Pietra, Tragliata and Tragliatella.

Economy
Fiumicino is home to the largest airport in Italy, the Leonardo da Vinci–Fiumicino Airport, which includes the Fiumicino Aeroporto railway station. The city also houses the head offices of Blue Panorama Airlines.

In addition, Fiumicino has a large fishing center on the Tyrrhenian Sea coast and a sea resort.

Education
The Istituto di Istruzione Superiore Leonardo da Vinci is in Fiumicino.

Transport

The "Leonardo Da Vinci" International Airport, also known as "Rome–Fiumicino", lies in the north-eastern suburb of the town. It is served by the A91 motorway from Rome and by the Roman Suburban Railway line FL1.

The municipality contains the railway stations of Fiumicino Aeroporto and Parco Leonardo, both on the line FL1. Airport station is also served by a non-stop train from/to Roma Termini named the Leonardo Express.

The other stations within the municipality, Maccarese–Fregene and Torre in Pietra–Palidoro, are on the Rome–Pisa line. The branch line from Parco Leonardo to the town's centre, including the stations of Porto, Fiumicino and Fiumicino Porto Canale, was closed in 2000.

Personalities
Mauro Galvano (b. 1964), boxer
Gabriele Maruotti (b. 1988), volleyball player
Simone Tiribocchi (b. 1978), football player
Davide Mattei (b. 2001), rapper

Gallery

See also

 Portus
 Isola Sacra
 1973 Rome airport attacks and hijacking
 Rome and Vienna airport attacks

References

External links

 Comune of Fiumicino
 Fiumicino on comuni-italiani.it

 
Coastal towns in Lazio
Mediterranean port cities and towns in Italy
Tyrrhenian Sea
Cittaslow
Fishing communities in Italy
Former municipi of Rome